Israel "Ulu" Grosbard (9 January 1929 – 19 March 2012) was a Belgian-born, naturalized American theatre and film director and film producer.

Life and career
Born in Antwerp, Grosbard was the son of Rose (Tenenbaum) and Morris Grosbard, who worked in business and as a diamond merchant. Grosbard emigrated to Havana with his family in 1942; they were fleeing the persecution of Jews by the German occupiers of Belgium during World War II. In 1948, they moved to the United States, where he earned Bachelor of Arts and Master of Arts degrees from the University of Chicago. He studied then at the Yale School of Drama for one year before joining the United States Army. Grosbard became a naturalized citizen in 1954.

Grosbard gravitated towards theatre when he relocated to New York City in the early 1960s. After directing The Days and Nights of BeeBee Fenstermaker off-Broadway, he earned his first Broadway credit with The Subject Was Roses, for which he was nominated for the Tony Award for Best Direction of a Play in 1964. That same year he won the Obie Award for Best Direction and the Drama Desk Award for Outstanding Director of a Play for an off-Broadway revival of the Arthur Miller play A View from the Bridge, for which Dustin Hoffman served as stage manager and assistant director.

Grosbard's additional Broadway credits include Miller's The Price; David Mamet's American Buffalo, which earned him Tony and Drama Desk Award nominations; Woody Allen's The Floating Light Bulb; and a revival of Paddy Chayefsky's The Tenth Man.

In Hollywood, Grosbard worked as an assistant director on Splendor in the Grass, West Side Story, The Hustler, The Miracle Worker, and The Pawnbroker  before helming the screen adaptation of The Subject Was Roses on his own. Additional screen credits include Who Is Harry Kellerman and Why Is He Saying Those Terrible Things About Me? and Straight Time, both with Dustin Hoffman; True Confessions and Falling in Love, both with Robert De Niro; Georgia, for which he won the Grand Prix des Amériques at the Montréal World Film Festival; and The Deep End of the Ocean.

Personal life
Grosbard was married to actress Rose Gregorio from 1965 to his death. Grosbard died on 19 March 2012 at the Langone Medical Center in Manhattan. He was 83.

References

External links
 
 
 Ulu Grosbard at the Lortel Archives

1929 births
2012 deaths
Mass media people from Antwerp
Belgian Jews
American people of Belgian-Jewish descent
Belgian emigrants to the United States
American theatre directors
Belgian theatre directors
American film directors
Belgian film directors
University of Chicago alumni
Yale School of Drama alumni
Drama Desk Award winners
Burials at Kensico Cemetery
Naturalized citizens of the United States